Don Furness may refer to:
 Don Furness (Australian rules footballer) (1930–2002) 
 Don Furness (rugby union) (1921–c. 1993), Australian rugby union player